Bulawayo Central Hospital is a 600-bed health care institution located in Bulawayo, Zimbabwe.

The Government of Zimbabwe funds the hospital, this is supplemented by fees from patients.

See also 
 List of hospitals in Zimbabwe

References 

Buildings and structures in Bulawayo
Hospitals in Zimbabwe